Spectros is a Brazilian supernatural thriller streaming television series that premiered on Netflix on February 20, 2020. The seven-episode series is run by writer-director Douglas Petrie and produced by Moonshot Pictures.

According to Doug Petrie, the series is a mix of Brazilian folklore and history, with elements of Japanese ghost tales, represented by the colorful streets of Liberdade district, home to the largest Japanese community outside Japan in the world.

Plot 
The show is in the Liberdade district in São Paulo. Spectros tells the story of a group of five teenagers who are accidentally attracted to a supernatural reality that they can not comprehend and that connects to the same location of the city in 1908. When confronted by increasingly bizarre and gloomy events, the group comes to an inevitable conclusion: someone is bringing the dead back, and the spirits want revenge for the mistakes committed in the past.

Cast 
Danilo Mesquita
Enzo Barone
Cláudia Okuno
Pedro Carvalho
Mariana Sena

Episodes

References

External links
 
 

2020 Brazilian television series debuts
Brazilian drama television series
Brazilian supernatural television series
Portuguese-language Netflix original programming
Television series about teenagers
Television shows filmed in São Paulo (state)
Television shows set in São Paulo